"Rollin' (Air Raid Vehicle)" is a song by the American rap rock band Limp Bizkit from their album Chocolate Starfish and the Hot Dog Flavored Water. It was released as the second and third single simultaneously, along with "My Generation", on September 5, 2000. The song peaked at number 65 on the US Billboard Hot 100 and remained in the chart for 17 weeks. To date, it is their highest-charting single in the Billboard Hot 100. Outside of the United States, "Rollin' (Air Raid Vehicle)" topped the charts in the Republic of Ireland and the United Kingdom and peaked within the top 10 of the charts in Austria, Finland, Germany, Norway, Portugal, and Sweden.

"Rollin' (Urban Assault Vehicle)", was the original version of the song, although sometimes it is referred to as a hip-hop remix of "Rollin' (Air Raid Vehicle)". It features hip-hop artists DMX, Method Man and Redman, and was produced by Swizz Beatz. It is included as the second-to-last track on the Chocolate Starfish album. This version is also featured on the soundtrack to the 2001 film The Fast and the Furious.

Writing and recording
Rollin was created through a collaborative effort with hip-hop producer Swizz Beatz. Although sometimes referred to as a hip-hop remix, the Urban Assault Vehicle version of the song was actually the first version that was created. Fred and Swizz Beatz worked together to create this version and when it was presented to the band there was some initial frustration. The band felt the song might work better as a rock song, which led to the creation of the Air Raid Vehicle version of the song. Wes Borland would later state "we liked both versions so much that that's what it ended up being, two versions: a hip-hop version of the song and a rock version of the song."

Music video
The music video was filmed in September 2000 atop the South Tower of the original World Trade Center in New York City. The introduction features Ben Stiller and Stephen Dorff mistaking Fred Durst for the valet and giving him the keys to their Bentley Azure, out front of The Roxy Hotel. Also making a cameo is break dancer Mr. Wiggles. The rest of the video has several cuts to Durst and his bandmates hanging out of the Bentley as they drive about Manhattan. The song Ben Stiller is playing at the beginning is "My Generation" from the same album. The video also features scenes of Fred Durst with five girls dancing in a room. The video was filmed around the same time as the film Zoolander, which explains Stiller and Dorff's appearance. Fred Durst has a small cameo in that film.

The "Rollin'" video received the award for Best Rock Video at the 2001 MTV Video Music Awards. On September 10, 2001 (the day before the Twin Towers were destroyed in the September 11 attacks), Limp Bizkit received a letter and a fruit basket from the Port Authority of New York City, thanking them for featuring the twin towers in the video and congratulating the band after the video had won the VMA for video of the year at the VMAs on September 6th.

About the music video, Durst said: "It felt like we just started to poke fun at what people thought we were and embrace that. That’s why we made the Rollin’ video. There were red caps everywhere, and look at Wes at the beginning of the video with his grills in. How the hell did people not realize we weren’t being serious? We thought it was hilarious."

Reception
In 2022, Louder Sound and Kerrang ranked the song number eight and number nine, respectively, on their lists of Limp Bizkit's greatest songs.

Track listings
The song was released in three versions, each with a different cover color and track listing. There was also a DVD that was only released in the United Kingdom.

CD1
 "Rollin' (Air Raid Vehicle)"
 "I Would for You (Live)"
 "Take a Look Around (Instrumental)"
 "Rollin' (Air Raid Vehicle)" (music video)

CD2
 "Rollin' (Air Raid Vehicle)"
 "Show Me What You Got"
 "Rollin' (Instrumental)"
 Video Snippets

DVD
 Video Snippets
 "My Generation" – 0:30
 "N 2 Gether Now" – 0:30
 "Break Stuff" – 0:30
 "Re-Arranged" – 0:30

Charts and certifications

Weekly charts

Year-end charts

Certifications

Release history

In popular culture

The song was parodied as "Posin'" on the television series MADtv, and the "Air Raid Vehicle" version was listed on VH1's list of the 50 Most Awesomely Bad Songs.

Hall of Fame MLB player Scott Rolen used the song as his walk-up song before he batted.

"Rollin' (Air Raid Vehicle)" was well known among WWE fans as the entrance theme for professional wrestler The Undertaker from December 2000 to May 2002, and again for WrestleMania XIX in 2003 where it was performed live.

The song is featured as a selectable track on the Hollywood Rip Ride Rockit roller coaster at Universal Studios Florida.

A short section of the song plays before the nighttime drag race in the first The Fast and the Furious film. It is also the song in the intro video of NHL Hitz 20-02, and is heard in the menus and gameplay as well. The song was also the goal song for the Buffalo Sabres of the NHL from 2005 to 2007.

It was featured in American Dad!s episode "Next of Pin".

The song was used in an Intro Performance Trailer by K-pop group BTS in 2015.

References

2000 singles
2000 songs
Flip Records (1994) singles
Interscope Records singles
Irish Singles Chart number-one singles
Limp Bizkit songs
Music videos directed by Fred Durst
Number-one singles in Scotland
Songs written by Fred Durst
Songs written by John Otto (drummer)
Songs written by Sam Rivers (bassist)
Songs written by Wes Borland
UK Singles Chart number-one singles
World Trade Center